Wok Tai Wan was a bay on the northwest coast of Tsing Yi Island, Hong Kong. The beach in the bay was once a naturist resort. The difficulties involved in getting to the bay on foot with high its surrounding hills, or by small boat because of turbulence in the nearby sea, made it the ideal place for nudists to swim and sunbathe. Because of the resort, the bay once became an attraction for hikers even after the activities ceased. 

Wok Tai in Cantonese means the bottom of the wok, a round-bottom pan. The bay named because its wok shape.

Nudism
In 1932, the European Herbert Edward Lanepart set up a nudist club in Heung Fan Liu in Sha Tin. He later sold the premises in 1938 because the building of Shing Mun Reservoir in 1935 and the Japanese invasion of China in 1937 seriously affected his business.

Between 1938 and 1941, he used his boat to take his nudist club members to the bay to continue their gathering. The number of members reached its height at around 20.

During the Japanese occupation of Hong Kong (1941–1945), he lost his boat and the club's activities were interrupted. He rented boats instead to take the members to the bay and reformed his club as a sunbathing club 1950s.

On 1 January 1968, all nudist activities halted owing to insufficient participants.

Tsing Ma Bridge
The bay remained largely silent in the 1970s and 1980s, and only occasionally explorers came to find its past.

The bay became more accessible when Hongkong United Dockyards (HUD) was built closer to the bay in 1976. Tsing Yi Road was extended to the dockyard.

The early 1990s saw construction of the Tsing Ma Bridge, an integral part of the Port and Airport Development Strategy. The suspension bridge spans from the hill at the back of Wok Tai Wan. Wok Tai Wan was reclaimed for building one of the two towers of the bridge and for a pier supporting the road from the tower to the hill.

Tsing Yi
Bays of Hong Kong
Beaches of Hong Kong
Naturist resorts